The 4 Hours of Shanghai (previously 6 Hours of Shanghai) is a sports car race that is held at the Shanghai International Circuit in Jiading District of Shanghai in the People's Republic of China. It was created for the FIA World Endurance Championship, and was held for the first time on 28 October 2012 as the eighth and final round of the 2012 World Endurance Championship.

Results

Records

Wins by constructor

Wins by engine supplier

Wins by team

References 

 
Recurring sporting events established in 2012
Sports competitions in Shanghai
Auto races in China
2012 establishments in China
Sports car races
Endurance motor racing